Milka-Emilia Pasanen (born 31 May 1997 in Pieksämäki) is a Finnish tennis player.

Playing for Finland at the Fed Cup, Pasanen has a win–loss record of 2–3.

References

External links 
 
 
 

1997 births
Living people
People from Pieksämäki
Finnish female tennis players
Sportspeople from South Savo
20th-century Finnish women
21st-century Finnish women